Denzil Quarrier is a novel written by the English author George Gissing, which was originally published in February 1892.

Further reading
 Ettorre, Emanuela (2001). "Sensational Gissing? Denzil Quarrier and the 'Politics' of Dissimulation." In: A Garland for Gissing. Amsterdam: Rodopi, pp. 67–80.
 Halperin, John (1979). Introduction to Denzil Quarrier. Brighton: The Harvest Press. 
 Tintner, Adeline R. (1993). "Denzil Quarrier: Gissing's Ibsen Novel," English Studies, Vol. LXIV, No. 3, pp. 225–232.

External links
 Denzil Quarrier, at Internet Archive
 Denzil Quarrier, at Project Gutenberg

Novels by George Gissing
1892 British novels
Victorian novels
Novels set in England
Novels set in the 19th century